Dendrophryniscus stawiarskyi is a species of toad in the family Bufonidae. It is endemic to Brazil and only known from its type locality, Bituruna in the Paraná state. Its natural habitat is humid rainforest where it occurs in the forest leaf-litter. It is threatened by habitat loss.

References

stawiarskyi
Endemic fauna of Brazil
Amphibians of Brazil
Taxa named by Eugênio Izecksohn
Amphibians described in 1994
Taxonomy articles created by Polbot